The Autonomous University Center of Brazil - UniBrasil is a Brazilian higher education institution, which has campus in the city of Curitiba, Paraná. It has undergraduate courses on fields of health, biology, math, engineering, human sciences, and law. UniBrasil has also educational programs in specialization courses and a Master in Law Program.

UniBrasil was founded on 22 April 2000 and is maintained by the professors Dr. Clèmerson Merlin Clève and Dr. Wilson Ramos Filho. The institution begun its activities just with the School of Law, called, in that time, as Faculty of Applied Social Sciences of Brazil. In 2003, UniBrasil became Integrated Faculties of Brazil and, in 2014, the institution became Autonomous University Center of Brazil.

References

External links
 Official Homepage (Portuguese)

Universities and colleges in Curitiba
Educational institutions established in 2000
2000 establishments in Brazil